Senator Whitaker may refer to:

Nelson E. Whitaker (1839–1909), West Virginia State Senate
Ruth Whitaker (1936–2014), Arkansas State Senate